Hathiar ( Pakistani, Punjabi) The film was released on 1 June 1979. 

The film was directed by M. Akram. The composer of the songs of the film was Nazir Ali. The song was sung by famous Pakistani singers Noor Jehan, Naheed Akhtar and Alam Lohar. The melodies were composed by poet Khawaja Pervez.

Cast 

 Sultan Rahi as (Sultan)
 Mustafa Qureshi as (Maluo)
 Aasia as (Gulabo)
 Ghazal as (Taji)
 Gori as (Rajjo)
 Alam Lohar as (Alam Lohar)
 Sabiha Khanum as (Sultan of Mother)
 Rangeela as (Lohar)
 Kamal Irani as (Justice)
 Tariq Aziz as (Police Inspector)

Track listing

References

External links
 

1979 films
1979 drama films
Pakistani crime action films
Pakistani musical films
Punjabi-language Pakistani films
1970s Punjabi-language films